Triny Bourkel (16 April 1927 – 21 February 2019) was a Luxembourgian athlete. She competed in the women's high jump at the 1948 Summer Olympics. She died on 21 February 2019, aged 91.

References

1927 births
2019 deaths
Athletes (track and field) at the 1948 Summer Olympics
Luxembourgian female high jumpers
Olympic athletes of Luxembourg
Sportspeople from Luxembourg City